Percy Charles Hugh Wyndham  (born 23 September 1864;died 6 Oct. 1943), was a senior British diplomat.
The son of Sir Hugh Wyndham, Wyndham was educated at Eton and New College, Oxford and entered the Diplomatic Service in 1890. He served at Berlin, Teheran, Constantinople, Madrid, Washington, D.C., Caracas, Brussels and Rome.He was  Minister Plenipotentiary to the Republic of Colombia from 1911 to 1918.

References

1864 births
1943 deaths
People educated at Eton College
Alumni of New College, Oxford
Ambassadors of the United Kingdom to Colombia
Knights Commander of the Order of St Michael and St George